Neptune Wellness Solutions, Inc. is a diversified wellness company that provides nutraceuticals, organic food and beverages, and consumer packaged goods to retail and business customers. Originally known for Antarctic krill oil production, the company previously operated an industrial-scale licensed cannabis processing plant in Quebec, CA, and a hemp processing facility in North Carolina in the U.S. until selling the cannabis business in 2022.

History

Krill Oil Production and Nutrition Products 
Neptune Wellness Solutions (originally Neptune Technologies and Bioresources) was founded by Henri Harland and Luc Rainville in 1998. The Canadian biotech company conducted some of the first research on the health benefits of krill oil and the unique, absorption capacity of its “phospholipid” molecular structure and the fats contained within it. Neptune secured a family of patents - for an extraction process as well as composition and method of use.

In 2002, the company pioneered the production and extraction of Antarctic krill oil. In 2003, after constructing a new facility in Sherbrooke, Quebec, Neptune launched its first product, Neptune Krill Oil, creating a new omega-3 category, manufactured using acetone as a solvent.

In 2012, an explosion in Neptune's processing plant resulted in three deaths and halted production at the facility. Following the accident, the company spent two years rebuilding the plant and was required to meet several safety conditions before resuming production in 2014.

In January 2016 Neptune expanded its nutrition products offering via the acquisition of privately held dietary supplement solution provider BioDroga.   

In 2017, Neptune essentially exited the bulk krill oil manufacturing and distribution business, selling its client list to its main competitor, Aker BioMarine of Oslo, Norway, for $34 million. The company invested the proceeds of the sale toward the $70 million conversion project of its Sherbrooke facility to process cannabis biomass using new cold-ethanol technology and rebranded to Neptune Wellness Solutions.   

In 2019 and following a significant transformation of the company via acquisition, divestment, and new business innovation Neptune was recognized for the first time by the Toronto Stock Exchange as a top 30 performing company for the three-year period prior to June 2019 (#8).   

In 2021 Neptune announced the acquisition of a controlling interest in Sprout Foods.

Cannabis / Hemp Production 
Neptune was licensed by Health Canada in January 2019 to enter the cannabis market, allowing the company to manufacture and purify cannabis extracts and oil.  After receiving the license, the company entered into a three-year contract with Canadian companies The Green Organic Dutchman and Tilray, securing cannabis and hemp biomass for extraction of crude resin, winterized oil, and distillate extracts for their products.  In May 2019, Neptune entered the U.S. hemp market by acquiring the assets of SugarLeaf Labs and Forest Remedies. The purchase included a 24,000-square-foot cold-ethanol hemp processing facility, located in Conover, NC. 

In July 2019, Jim Hamilton, CEO since 2015 stepped down at which time his successor Michael Cammarata, the former CEO of Schmidt's Naturals.  was appointed as Neptune's CEO.

Products

Krill Oil 
Made from Antarctic krill, a sustainable and non-genetically modified source of omega-3 fatty acids, Neptune's krill-based supplements are available to consumers in the U.S. and Canada for direct purchase or through its distributors.

Hemp Oil 
Neptune produces hemp-derived products exclusively from U.S.-grown hemp. The company is involved in all aspects of product production, including farmer collaboration during the growth cycle to processing, formulating, testing, packaging, and distributing finished products to customers. Its products include ingestibles and topical products and are safe for both humans and pets.

Cannabis Oil 
At its Canadian facility, Neptune extracts, purifies, and formulates cannabis oil for the Canadian and global medical cannabis communities.

Hand Sanitizer 
Neptune began distributing U.S.-made, alcohol-based hand sanitizers in response to the COVID-19 pandemic.

References

External links

 Cannabis companies of Canada
Companies based in Quebec
Companies listed on the Nasdaq
Companies formerly listed on the Toronto Stock Exchange